Didier Daurat (2 January 1891, Montreuil-sous-Bois – 2 December 1969, Toulouse) was a pioneer of French aviation. He was a fighter pilot during World War I, distinguishing himself by spotting the Paris Gun which was pounding Paris. After the war, he joined an airline company, which later became the Compagnie générale aéropostale - Aéropostale, then Air France, where he was a pilot and later operations director.

From then, the legend of the man with the iron will made him a boss admired by many, feared by all and hated by some. He did not hesitate to dismiss those who showed the slightest sign of weakness, questioned his methods or did not adhere to the 'spirit of the mail' (l'esprit du courrier).

Many of his pilots began their careers as grease monkeys, taking apart, cleaning and reassembling engines. According to Daurat, that formed character and taught pilots to respect their machines. However, he knew when he saw a talented pilot. When Jean Mermoz presented himself in Toulouse and made a dazzling display of piloting skill, Daurat told him, "I don't need circus artists but bus drivers." (Je n'ai pas besoin d'artistes de cirque mais de conducteurs d'autobus.) Nevertheless, he hired him to clean the engines.

These methods proved their worth because the Latécoère lines, and later Aéropostale, achieved a level of punctuality and reliability unknown for the time on the Toulouse-Saint-Louis-du-Sénégal route, and later from Toulouse-Santiago, Chile, Chile with a crossing of the South Atlantic and the Andes.

When Aéropostale was integrated with Air France in 1933, Daurat, friendless, was dismissed.

In 1935, he founded the Air Bleu company, which transported mail throughout France by day as well as by night. Results were remarkable, but the company was militarised with the declaration of war, in 1939.

Following the Liberation of France, he relaunched the night postal service before becoming operations chief for Air France at Orly, which until his retirement, in 1953.

He died in Toulouse in 1969. At his request, he was granted the honour of being buried on the Toulouse-Montaudran Airport, the former base of Aéropostale.

Antoine de Saint-Exupéry took inspiration from him for the character of Rivière in Night Flight (Vol de nuit, 1931).

Publications

Saint-Exupéry tel que je l'ai connu (1954)
Dans le vent des hélices (1956)

1891 births
1969 deaths
People from Montreuil, Seine-Saint-Denis
French aviators
French military personnel of World War I